Noname Jane is an American pornographic actress. In the majority of the pornographic films in which she appeared, she used the stage name Violet Blue. In October 2007, a lawsuit brought by the author Violet Blue charged that Jane had adopted the author's name and persona, prompting Jane to change her stage name to Violetta Blue, and then to Noname Jane, in response to an injunction in the case.

Early life
Jane was born in Aberdeen, Washington and she is of Cherokee, Dutch, English, and French descent. She stated that she began "messing around with boys" at around age seven and that she had sexual intercourse for the first time at age 13 while her parents were out playing bingo. She began studying magick and witchcraft at the age of 16 and was initiated into Ordo Templi Orientis, a Thelemic religious organization, at age 21.

Career

Prior to making pornographic films, she claimed, in an interview, to have worked as a stripper in Salt Lake City, Utah, and she only started acting in pornographic movies in Los Angeles after pornographic magazines were not interested in her. She appeared in over 300 pornographic films under the name "Violet Blue", several of which were produced by Wicked Pictures and Vivid Entertainment. The films became popular in Japan, and she performed in two pornographic films with Japanese men. She was represented by the Gold Star Modeling talent agency.

Retirement
In April 2005, Noname Jane announced that in May, she would return to her home state of Washington and that her husband would stay in Los Angeles to continue working for pornographer Stoney Curtis. Her mother had bought a house for her to live in. She expressed that she wanted to help care for her sick father and to give her son a healthier environment. Jane announced that she would continue to be represented by Gold Star Modeling, and she also said, "I'll be anxious to come back and visit my porn valley friends so let me know when you have me in mind for a project."

In August 2006, Noname Jane announced by email that she would no longer perform in pornographic scenes with men, stating her reasons as a desire to be monogamous with her boyfriend, Dick Danger. She gave birth to her second child, a girl whom she named "Clover", in May 2007. She also hosts an Internet radio show called Recipes for Sex on KSEX. In July 2007, she announced a "memorabilia sale", offering the clothing she had worn and sex toys that she had used in photo shoots and films.

In January 2009, Noname Jane announced on her Myspace blog that she would resume working with male talent. In August 2010, Noname Jane announced on her MySpace blog that she would only be performing with one male actor, Dick Danger, and that, in spite of her earlier announcement, she had not subsequently worked with any other male talent.

Trademark infringement issue
In October 2007, author Violet Blue filed suit in federal court alleging trademark violation and dilution, as well as unfair business practices with  author Blue's persona and belatedly-trademarked name being used. The pornographic actress had used the name since 2000 and was financially unable to properly defend herself. The court issued a preliminary injunction that forced her to stop using the name "Violet Blue" or anything confusingly similar; the stage name Noname Jane was adopted instead.

Awards and nominations
 2002 AVN Award winner - Best New Starlet

References

External links

 
 
 
 Noname Jane Interview on (re)Search my Trash

American people of Cherokee descent
American people of Dutch descent
American people of English descent
American people of French descent
American pornographic film actresses
American Thelemites
Living people
Members of Ordo Templi Orientis
People from Aberdeen, Washington
Pornographic film actors from Washington (state)
Year of birth missing (living people)